Poboishche is a rural locality (a selo) and the administrative centre of Poboishchensky Selsoviet, Kugarchinsky District, Bashkortostan, Russia. The population was 194 as of 2010. There are 4 streets.

Geography 
Poboishche is located 53 km east of Mrakovo (the district's administrative centre) by road. Shcherbaki is the nearest rural locality.

References 

Rural localities in Kugarchinsky District